Eastbrook School is a coeducational primary school, secondary school and sixth form located in Barking and Dagenham, London, England.

The sixth form is part of the North East Consortium (NEC) where it joins other schools: Robert Clack and all saints. This allows the students to be able to choose from a wider range of subjects.

The Executive Headteacher and Secondary Headteacher is Avani Higgins, and the Primary Headteacher is Evan Hollows.

Notable alumni
 Ron Pember (actor)
 Tony Adams (footballer)
 Paul Konchesky (footballer)
 Jack Kendall (rugby union)

References

Secondary schools in the London Borough of Barking and Dagenham
Educational institutions established in 1933
1933 establishments in England
Community schools in the London Borough of Barking and Dagenham
Primary schools in the London Borough of Barking and Dagenham